Thomas Chapel may refer to:

 Thomas Chapel, Pembrokeshire, a place in Wales, see Kilgetty/Begelly
 Thomas' Methodist Episcopal Chapel, also known as Thomas Chapel, a Methodist chapel and cemetery near Chapeltown in Kent County, Delaware
 Thomas Methodist Episcopal Chapel, also known as Thomas Chapel, a Methodist Episcopal church in Thaxton, Bedford County, Virginia